The 2007 UK local government elections were held on 3 May 2007. These elections took place in most of England and all of Scotland. There were no local government elections in Wales though the Welsh Assembly had a general election on the same day. There were no local government elections in Northern Ireland. Just over half of English councils and almost all the Scottish councils began the counts on Friday, rather than Thursday night, because of more complex arrangements regarding postal votes.

These elections were a landmark in the United Kingdom as it was the first time that 18- to 20-year-olds could stand as candidates for council seats. The change was due to an alteration of the Electoral Administration Act. At least fourteen 18- to 20-year-olds are known to have stood as candidates for council seats and as a result William Lloyd became the youngest person to be elected to official office in Britain. There were also a number of councils which used new voting methods such as internet and telephone voting in addition to the traditional methods of polling stations and postal votes.

These were the final elections to be overseen by Labour leader and prime minister Tony Blair, who resigned the following month after a decade as prime minister to be succeeded by chancellor Gordon Brown. His party only finished in second place with a narrow lead over the third-placed Liberal Democrats, whose leader Menzies Campbell would also resign later in the year, while it was a strong showing for the Conservatives under David Cameron.

Summary of results
There was a suggestion in February 2006 that many of the 2007 local elections in England would be cancelled due to a reform of local government. However, since then possible reforms are still in the consultation stage and no decisions have yet been made.

312 English district councils, nearly all districts in England held some form of election – either thirds or full – on Thursday, 3 May 2007.

The final results are summarised below; firstly, with a table ranked by the party with the greatest number of councillors elected.

Source BBC BBC NEWS | Politics | Vote 2007 | English councils map

England

Mayoral elections

Scotland

All 32 Scottish councils had all their seats up for election - all Scottish councils are unitary authorities.  These local elections were held on the same day as the Scottish Parliament general election.  They were the first election for local government in mainland Great Britain to use the Single transferable vote (the system is used in Northern Ireland), as implemented by the Local Governance (Scotland) Act 2004.

Summary of results

Councils

The notional results in the following table are based on a document that John Curtice and Stephen Herbert (Professors at the University of Strathclyde) produced on 3 June 2005, calculating the effect of the introduction of the Single Transferable Vote on the 2003 Scottish Local Elections.

Pre-election predictions
A Newsnight poll by the analysts Rallings and Thrasher some days before the election predicted the following results for the English council elections:

Con 38% (Conservatives gaining 330 seats and losing 2% of the vote on 2006)

Lab 24% (Labour losing 500 seats and losing 2% of the vote on 2006)

LD 29% (Liberal Democrats gaining 110 seats and gaining 2% of the vote on 2006)

However, these predictions, as in 2006, were largely inaccurate, underestimating Conservative support and grossly overestimating the Lib Dems' performance. However, it did accurately predict the number of seats Labour would lose.

Notes and references

External links
Results table (BBC News)
Overview of councils up for election 
CityMayors article
Young candidates article

 
2007
Local elections
May 2007 events in the United Kingdom